Lloyd Wilson Bertaud (September 20, 1895 – September 6, 1927) was an American aviator. Bertaud was selected to be the copilot in the WB-2 Columbia attempting the transatlantic crossing for the Orteig Prize in 1927. Aircraft owner Charles Albert Levine wanted to fly in his place, and an injunction by Bertaud against Levine prevented the flight. The prize was won by the aviator Charles Lindbergh.

Biography
Bertaud was born in Alameda, California on September 20, 1895. As a boy, he built and flew in a glider from Popular Mechanics plans. He was a licensed pilot at the age of 18. In World War I, Bertaud served in the U.S. Army Air Service as a lieutenant.

On September 6, 1927 Bertaud and fellow air-mail pilot James DeWitt Hill flipped to see who would pilot the Fokker monoplane, the Old Glory, and Hill won. Bertaud, Hill and Philip Payne took off in the overweight plane over the Atlantic Ocean. The plane did not make it to the destination; only a 34-foot section of wing was found 700 miles east of Cape Race, Newfoundland. Bertaud was lost at sea.

Records and awards
Bertaud flew air mail routes along the famous "Hells Stretch" between Cleveland and Hadley Field.
Pulitzer Race, Omaha, Nebraska – In 1921, Bertaud flew a 400 hp Ansaldo A-1 Balilla equipped with a Curtiss D-12 engine against Bert Acosta, placing fourth.
Kansas City Derby, Kansas City, Kansas – In November 1921, Bertaud won the American Legion Aerial Derby over a 140-mile course in 1 hour.
Endurance record, Roosevelt Field – In January 1922, Bertaud and Edward Stinson won the Aviation medal of merit of the Aero Club of America for their 27-hour world endurance record flown during a snowstorm in the Junkers-Larsen JL-6 on December 30, 1921. The aircraft flew 2500 miles, also breaking the French-held world's record for distance.
Orteig Prize - Charles A. Levine, owner of Columbia Aircraft Corp, and the sole Wright-Bellanca WB-2 sought after by pilot Charles Lindbergh, bumped Bertaud from his copilot position on an attempt at the Orteig Prize. Bertaud was promised a settlement to his family if he and his co-pilot Clarence D. Chamberlin crashed, and the prize money if they completed the flight, but Levine refused to sign the document. Bertaud first objected, then later offered to purchase the Columbia for himself. Bertaud, filed an injunction, and stalled the flight. Lindbergh took off winning the prize. Levine fired Bertaud, and, two weeks later, had Chamberlin fly him to Berlin, Germany as the first transatlantic passenger. They landed in Eisleben, and breaking Lindbergh's distance mark by 295 miles. Following the flight, Bertaud attempted to have Bellanca, the designer of the Columbia, build a transatlantic plane for a non-stop attempt on Rome in spite of Levine. The aircraft could not be built in a timely manner. Instead, an agreement was made with Philip Payne, editor of the William Randolph Hearst paper the New York Daily Mirror, for a Fokker F.VIIA named Old Glory aircraft, and a spare seat for Payne, in exchange for the publicity rights.

Legacy
In 1928, the Ontario Surveyor General named a number of lakes in the northwest of the province to honour aviators who had perished during 1927, mainly in attempting oceanic flights. These include Bertaud Lake, Hill Lake and Payne Lake.

See also
List of people who disappeared mysteriously at sea

References

External links 

1895 births
1920s missing person cases
1927 deaths
American aviation record holders
Aviators from California
Aviators killed in aviation accidents or incidents in Canada
Flight endurance record holders
Missing aviators
Missing person cases in Canada
People lost at sea
United States airmail pilots
Victims of aviation accidents or incidents in 1927